Hero of the Federation may refer to:
Hero of the Russian Federation
Starship Troopers 2: Hero of the Federation